The October 1974 Dissolution Honours List was issued on 5 December 1974, following the dissolution of the United Kingdom parliament in preparation for a general election.

Life peers

Conservative
 Rt Hon. Robert Alexander, Lord Balniel, Minister of State, Ministry of Defence 1970-72; Minister of State, Foreign and Commonwealth Office 1972-74; Member of Parliament for the Hertford Division of Hertfordshire 1955-74.
 Rt Hon. Anthony Perrinott Lysberg Barber , Chancellor of the Exchequer 1970-74. Member of Parliament for Doncaster 1951-64; Altrincham and Sale 1965-74.
 Rt Hon. Gordon Thomas Calthrop Campbell , Secretary of State for Scotland 1970-74. Member of Parliament for Moray and Nairn 1959-74.
 Sir Harmar Nicholls , Parliamentary Secretary, Ministry of Agriculture, Fisheries and Food 1955-57; Ministry of Works, 1957-60. Member of Parliament for the Peterborough Division of Northamptonshire 1950-74.
 Sir Arnold Silverstone, Joint Treasurer, Conservative and Unionist Party.
 Dame Joan Helen Vickers , Member of Parliament for the Devonport Division of Plymouth, 1955-74.
 Dame Irene Mary Bewick Ward , Member of Parliament for Wallsend 1931-45; Tynemouth 1950-74.

Labour
 Richard William Briginshaw, General Secretary, National Society of Operative Printers, Graphical and Media Personnel since 1951. Member, General Council of Trades Union Congress since 1965.
 Donald William Trevor Bruce, Member of Parliament for North Portsmouth 1945-50.
 Sir Hugh Kinsman Cudlipp , Chairman, International Publishing Corporation Ltd. 1968-73.
 Sir Sidney Francis Greene , General Secretary, National Union of Railwaymen since 1957.
 Reginald Thomas Paget , Member of Parliament for Northampton 1945-74.
 Mary Elizabeth Henderson, lately Chairman, Board of Governors, Charing Cross Hospital.
 George Douglas Wallace, Member of Parliament for the Chislehurst Division of Kent 1945-50; Norwich North 1964-74.
 Alfred Wilson, Chief Executive Officer, Co-operative Wholesale Society Ltd. 1969-74.

Other
 Desmond Anderson Harvie Banks , President, Liberal Party Organisation 1968-69. Member, Liberal Party Executive 1959-74; Chairman, 1961–63 and 1969-70.
 Braham Jack Lyons, Managing Director, Traverse Healy, Lyons and Partners.

References

Dissolution Honours
Dissolution Honours 1974